The Grand Rapids Hoops were a basketball team that played in the Continental Basketball Association based in Grand Rapids, Michigan. Their first season was in 1989 and their final season was in 2003. Professional basketball later returned to Grand Rapids with the Grand Rapids Flight in 2004.

League history
The team started and played in the Continental Basketball Association until the league folded in 2001. They joined the International Basketball League for one season before returning to a resurrected CBA the following year where they stayed until their demise.

Name history
The team first played in 1989 as the Grand Rapids Hoops. When the team was sold in 1995 to the people who ran the Gus Macker 3-on-3 Scott McNeal, the nickname changed to the Grand Rapids Mackers. The team was sold again a year later to an investment group with Bob Przybysz as the managing partner and the name reverted to the Grand Rapids Hoops.

Home court history
The Grand Rapids Hoops began their play in Welsh Auditorium in 1989. When the Van Andel Arena opened in the mid 1996, the Hoops moved there joining the Grand Rapids Griffins as tenants. As attendance fell, the team moved to the DeltaPlex, a smaller arena located out of the downtown area. The team disbanded in 2003. The franchise was purchased and moved to nearby Muskegon's LC Walker Arena and renamed the Michigan Mayhem in 2004, which has now been disbanded as well.

References

Continental Basketball Association teams
Sports in Grand Rapids, Michigan
Basketball teams established in 1989
Basketball teams in Michigan
Basketball teams disestablished in 2003
1989 establishments in Michigan
2003 disestablishments in Michigan
International Basketball League (1999–2001) teams